Crommium angustatum was a species of sea snail in the family Ampullinidae. Now extinct, it is known only from fossils. It was originally mistakenly identified as a freshwater snail in the Ampullariidae family. It has been found in France.

References 

Ampullinidae
Gastropods described in 1828
Marine gastropods
Fossil taxa described in 1828
Prehistoric gastropods